Amorphoscelis pantherina is a species of praying mantis native to Iraq.

References

Amorphoscelis
Fauna of Iraq
Insects described in 1966